Satake may refer to:
 
Satake clan, a Japanese samurai clan originally from Hitachi Province
Satake Corporation, a multinational agricultural equipment maker based in Hiroshima, Japan
Asteroid 8194 Satake
Ichirō Satake (1927–2014), Japanese mathematician
Satake isomorphism
Satake diagram
, Japanese women's basketball player
, Japanese sailor
, Japanese politician

Japanese-language surnames